Segeric was, according to Jordanes, the king who immediately followed Alaric I as ruler of the Visigoths.  He ruled only a short time and then was killed by his soldiers.

References
Jordanes.  History of the Goths in Geary, Patrick J., Readings in Medieval History. p. 97

5th-century Visigothic monarchs